Anne Holt (born 16 November 1958) is a Norwegian author, lawyer and former Minister of Justice.

Early life
She was born in Larvik, grew up in Lillestrøm and Tromsø, and moved to Oslo in 1978. Holt graduated with a law degree from the University of Bergen in 1986, and worked for The Norwegian Broadcasting Corporation (NRK) in the period 1984 to 1988.

Career
She then worked at the Oslo Police Department for two years, earning her right to practice as a lawyer in Norway. In 1990 she returned to NRK, where she worked one year as a journalist and anchor woman for the news program Dagsrevyen.

Anne Holt started her own law practice in 1994, and served as the Minister of Justice in Cabinet Jagland for a short period from 25 October 1996 to 4 February 1997. She resigned for health reasons, and was replaced by Gerd-Liv Valla.

Writing
In 1993 she made her debut as a novelist with the crime novel Blind gudinne, featuring the lesbian police officer Hanne Wilhelmsen. The two novels Løvens gap (1997) and Uten ekko (2000) are co-authored with her former state secretary Berit Reiss-Andersen.

Her 2015 novel Offline is about a terrorist attack on an Islamic cultural center by a group of extreme Norwegian nationalists.

She is one of the most successful crime novelists in Norway. She has been published in 25 countries. Val McDermid, a Scottish crime writer, has said that "Anne Holt is the latest crime writer to reveal how truly dark it gets in Scandinavia".

Piratforlaget
In 2004, Holt took part in the founding of the Norwegian branch of the Swedish publishing house, Piratforlaget, which had been started by the celebrated Swedish authors Jan Guillou and Liza Marklund. The objective, to publish bestselling writers at reduced prices, was controversial in Scandinavia, where book prices and author advances are highly standardized. Anders Heger, head of the Cappelen publishing house, expressed a widespread concern that Piratforlag would "intensify differences" between "the authors who earn a lot and those who don't."

Political views
Holt is a social democrat and a lifelong member of the Labour Party. She is outspoken against racism.

In 2012 Holt wrote an op-ed in Dagbladet about the Norwegian Labour Party and the time after Anders Behring Breivik's terror attacks in Norway in 2011.

In 2017 Holt wrote an op-ed in Dagens Nyheter in which she rejected the far-right view that Sweden's immigration policies were reckless and dangerous.

Honors and awards
She has won several awards, including the Riverton Prize (1994) for Salige er de som tørster, the  Bokhandler Prize (1995) for Demonens død, and the Cappelen Prize (2001).

Personal life
She lives in Oslo with her registered partner Anne Christine Kjær (also known as Tine Kjær) and their daughter Iohanne.

Bibliography

The Hanne Wilhelmsen series 
 1993 Blind gudinne (Blind Goddess)
 1994 Salige er de som tørster (Blessed Are Those Who Thirst)
 1995 Demonens død (Death of the Demon)
 1997 Løvens gap (co-authored with Berit Reiss-Andersen) (The Lion's Mouth)
 1999 Død joker (Dead Joker)
 2000 Uten ekko (co-authored with Berit Reiss-Andersen) (No Echo)
 2003 Sannheten bortenfor (The Truth Beyond)
 2007 1222
 2015 Offline (Offline/Odd Numbers)
 2016 I støv og aske (In Dust and Ashes)

Separate titles 
 1997 Mea culpa
 1998 I hjertet av VM. En fotballreise (co-authored with Erik Langbråten)
 1999 Bernhard Pinkertons store oppdrag
 2010 Flimmer (co-authored with Even Holt)
 2014 Sudden death (co-authored with Even Holt)

The Vik/Stubø series 
 2001 Det som er mitt (What is Mine/Punishment )
 2004 Det som aldri skjer (What never happens/The Final Murder )
 2006 Presidentens valg (Madam President/Death in Oslo )
 2009 Pengemannen (Fear Not)
 2012 Skyggedød (What Dark Clouds Hide)

References

External links
 Anne Holt's Swedish Publisher
 The Salomonsson Agency 
 Fantastic Fiction

20th-century Norwegian women politicians
1958 births
Female justice ministers
Labour Party (Norway) politicians
Lesbian novelists
Norwegian LGBT novelists
Norwegian LGBT politicians
Norwegian lesbian writers
Living people
Ministers of Justice of Norway
Norwegian crime fiction writers
Norwegian women lawyers
Norwegian women novelists
People from Larvik
People from Lillestrøm
People from Tromsø
University of Bergen alumni
Women crime fiction writers
Women government ministers of Norway
21st-century Norwegian LGBT people
20th-century Norwegian lawyers